KUAM-TV (channel 8) is a television station in Hagåtña (Agana), Guam, serving the U.S. territory as an affiliate of NBC and CBS. Owned by Pacific Telestations, LLC, it is sister to the local public access cable channel Local 2. KUAM-TV's studios are located at 600 Harmon Loop in Dededo, and its transmitter is located east-northeast of Agat.

History
KUAM was Guam's first television station, signing on August 5, 1956 on analog channel 8. It carried programming from all three networks, but has always been a primary NBC affiliate. KUAM began its first broadcast in color in 1970. When Fox debuted in 1986, they carried its lineup as well. For a time, this made KUAM one of the few stations to be affiliated with all four major networks.

Despite being affiliated with all four networks, KUAM was hindered by the fact that Guam was a day ahead of the U.S. mainland and that most shows, especially those from the network, were sent via air and/or mail, which meant that viewers would have to wait from a period of two weeks to a month to see any of the offerings. When it was not showing any network fare it featured local in-house programming, syndicated shows and films (mostly travel or cultural) to make up the difference.

KUAM-TV, together with KUAM radio, were originally owned by Harry S. Engel, a former owner-manager of radio station KVEN in Ventura, California, with Adam Young International as the stations' representative. Two enterprising mainlanders, H. Scott Kilgore and Sam Rubin, formed the Pacific Broadcasting Corporation and bought the KUAM stations in 1964; the company changed its name to Pacific Telestations, Inc. in the 1970s.

Between 1969 and 1980, a sister station, WSZE-TV (channel 10) served the Northern Mariana Islands from Saipan.

KUAM would lose ABC to KTGM when it began operations in 1987, and lost Fox to the same station in 1990. CBS programming was dropped in 1995 with the launch of KUAM-LP; that station, in turn, would be added as KUAM's digital subchannel, broadcasting on channel 8.2, in 2009.

As satellite technology started to take off and expand, KUAM began to gradually catch up with the rest of the continental United States. The station now follows the complete NBC schedule, but on a Tuesday–Monday pattern rather than the traditional Monday–Sunday pattern, with the exception of NBC's sports lineup, which is live in the early morning hours of Sunday (for all Saturday games and events) and Monday (for all Sunday games and events).

In 2006 KUAM's website, kuam.com, received honors at that year's RTNDA Edward R. Murrow Award for having the best small market web site.

On February 18, 2009, KUAM signed off its analog signal on channel 8 and switched on its digital signal also on channel 8.

Notable alumni
Madeleine Bordallo – Former TV host; served as the territory's Delegate to the U.S. House of Representatives

Subchannels

The station's digital signal is multiplexed:

See also
Channel 8 digital TV stations in the United States
Channel 8 virtual TV stations in the United States
Channel 11 branded TV stations in the United States

References

External links

UAM-TV
NBC network affiliates
CBS network affiliates
Television channels and stations established in 1956
1956 establishments in Guam